Hisham Mohamed Mekin (born 3 August 1959) is an Egyptian hurdler. He competed in the men's 110 metres hurdles at the 1984 Summer Olympics.

References

1959 births
Living people
Athletes (track and field) at the 1984 Summer Olympics
Egyptian male hurdlers
Olympic athletes of Egypt
Place of birth missing (living people)